The 1927 South Dakota State Jackrabbits football team was an American football team that represented South Dakota State College in the North Central Conference (NCC) during the 1927 college football season. In its ninth season under head coach Charles A. West, the team compiled a 5–3–1 record and outscored opponents by a total of 189 to 89.

Schedule

References

South Dakota State
South Dakota State Jackrabbits football seasons
South Dakota State Jackrabbits football